Events from the year 1673 in Sweden

Incumbents
 Monarch – Charles XI

Events

 Inauguration of the Christina Church
 The monarch makes his Eriksgata.
 The start of a five year long period of bad harvests.

Births

 Anna Catharina von Bärfelt, royal favorite (died 1738) 
 Christina Piper, politically influential countess and landowner (died 1752)

Deaths

 Anna Margareta von Haugwitz, countess (born 1622)

References

 
Years of the 17th century in Sweden
Sweden